Qurudərə or Kurudere is a Turkic word meaning "dry creek" and may refer to:

 Kurudere, Bismil
 Kurudere, Buldan
 Kurudere, Dicle
 Kurudere, Kulp
 Kurudere, Mersin, Turkey
 Kurudere, Pınarhisar, Turkey
 Kurudere, Şavşat, Turkey
 Kurudere, Savaştepe, Turkey
 Mousoulita, Northern Cyprus, whose Turkish name is Kurudere
 Qurudərə, Gadabay, Azerbaijan